The circumflex branch of left coronary artery (also known as the left circumflex artery, or circumflex artery) is a branch of the left coronary artery. It winds around the left side of the heart along the atrioventricular groove (coronary sulcus). It supplies the posterolateral portion of the left ventricle.

In a minority of individuals, the left circumflex artery gives rise to the posterior interventricular artery, in which cases such a heart is deemed left dominant.

Anatomy
The left circumflex artery follows the left part of the coronary sulcus, running first to the left and then to the right, reaching nearly as far as the posterior longitudinal sulcus. There have been multiple anomalies described, for example the left circumflex having an aberrant course from the right coronary artery.

Branches 
The circumflex artery curves to the left around the heart within the coronary sulcus, giving rise to one or more left marginal arteries (also called obtuse marginal branches) as it curves toward the posterior surface of the heart. It helps form the posterior left ventricular branch or posterolateral artery. The circumflex artery ends at the point where it joins to form to the posterior interventricular artery in 15% of all cases, which lies in the posterior interventricular sulcus. In the other 85% of all cases the posterior interventricular artery comes out of the right coronary artery. When the left circumflex supplies the posterior descending artery in those 15% of cases, it is known as a left dominant circulation.

Distribution 

The circumflex artery supplies the posterolateral left ventricle and the anterolateral papillary muscle.

It also supplies the sinoatrial nodal artery in 38% of people.

It supplies 15-25% of the left ventricle in right-dominant systems. If the coronary anatomy is left-dominant, the circumflex artery supplies 40-50% of the left ventricle.

Additional images

References

External links
  - "Anterior view of the heart."
  - "Posterior view of the heart."
  - "Heart: The Left Coronary Artery and its Branches"
 Image at merck.com
 Overview and diagrams at cardiologysite.com

Arteries of the thorax